Crocus hermoneus (Hebrew: כרכום החרמון) is a species of flowering plant in the genus Crocus of the family Iridaceae. It is a cormous perennial native to Lebanon, Syria, and Israel.

Crocus hermoneus has two subspecies: 
 Crocus hermoneus subsp. hermoneus
 Crocus hermoneus subsp. palaestinus Feinbrun

References

hermoneus